Traction is the first album by New Zealand rock band Supergroove. It was released in 1994 by RCA Records, debuting at number one on the New Zealand albums chart and quickly reached platinum status there. Before the band could record their second album, Che Fu was fired from the band. Supergroove would end up releasing their second and final album, Backspacer, without Fu. To date, the album has achieved the requirements for platinum status five times over.

Awards
The album won Best Album at the 1995 New Zealand Music Awards.

Track listing
All tracks written by Joe (Fisher) Lonie and Karl Steven except "You Gotta Know (Remix)" by Lonie, Steven, and Che Fu.

Charts

References

[ Traction on allmusicguide]
Amplifier article on Supergroove

1994 albums
Supergroove albums